Ruth Fine (born 1957 in Buenos Aires, Argentina) is a professor of Spanish and Latin-American literature at the Hebrew University of Jerusalem.

Biography
Ruth Fine chairs the Department of Spanish and Latin American Studies at the Hebrew University of Jerusalem. She served as Director of the European Forum and of the Institute of Western Cultures at the same academic institution.  Fine also was founder and first president of the Association of Hispanists in Israel. She is presently the President of the International Association of Hispanists and vice-president of the International Association of Cervantistas.
She was awarded with the Orden del Mérito Civil by Spain. 
Since 2016 she is Correspondent Member of the Spanish Royal Academy.
In 2019 she received an Honoris Causa Doctorate from the University of Navarra.

Published works 
Reescrituras bíblicas cervantinas, (in press), Biblioteca Áurea Hispánica-Iberoamericana. Frankfurt am Main/Madrid: Vervuert / Iberoamericana.
Fine, Ruth, Michele Guillemont and Juan Diego Vila (eds.) (2013), Lo converso: orden imaginario y realidad en la cultura española (siglos XIV-XVII), Madrid-Frankfurt Am Main: Iberoamericana-Vervuert, 536 pp.
Fine, Ruth y Daniel Blaustein (eds.) (2012), La fe en el universo literario de Jorge Luis Borges. Jerusalem, Van Leer Institute and Hildesheim ן¿½ Zürich ן¿½ New York: Georg Olms Verlag, TKKL Series directed by Alfonso de Toro.
Casado, Manuel, Ruth Fine y Carlos Mata (eds.) (2012), Jerusalén-Toledo. Historias de dos ciudades. Biblioteca Áurea Hispánica, Frankfurt am Main / Madrid: Vervuert / Iberoamericana.279 pp.
R. Fine y C. Mata (eds.) (2010) Textos sin fronteras. Literatura y sociedad, Pamplona, Editorial EUNSA.
Fine, Ruth and Ignacio Arellano (eds.)(2009) La Biblia en la literatura del Siglo de Oro.Biblioteca Áurea Hispánica, Frankfurt am Main/Madrid: Vervuert/Iberoamericana.
Fine, Ruth and Santiago López Navia (eds.)(2008). Cervantes y las religiones. Biblioteca Áurea Hispánica, Frankfurt am Main/Madrid: Vervuert/Iberoamericana.
Una lectura semiótico-narratológica del Quijote en el contexto del Siglo de Oro español. Frankfurt am Main/Madrid: Vervuert/Iberoamericana, 2006.

References

External links 
 The Association of Hispanists in Israel (Spanish)
 Prof. Fine's CV
 The Authority of Research and Development

Living people
Argentine emigrants to Israel
Argentine Jews
Academic staff of the Hebrew University of Jerusalem
Literary critics of Spanish
1957 births
University of Buenos Aires alumni